The Red "Lady" of Paviland is an Upper Paleolithic partial male skeleton dyed in red ochre and buried in Wales 33,000 BP. The bones were discovered in 1823 by William Buckland in an archaeological dig at Goat's Hole Cave (Paviland cave) which is a limestone cave between Port Eynon and Rhossili on the Gower Peninsula, near Swansea in south Wales. Buckland believed the skeleton was a Roman era female. Later, William Solace examined Goat's Cave Paviland in 1912. There, Solace found flint arrow heads and tools and correctly concluded that the skeleton was in fact a male hunter-gatherer or warrior during the last Ice Age. Over the last 100 years, more advanced dating procedures have shifted the age from the Mesolithic period (4-10,000 BCE) to the Palaeolithic era (35,000/10,000 BCE) of the last Ice Age.

Goat's Hole was occupied throughout prehistory. Artefacts are predominantly Aurignacian, but also include examples from the earlier Mousterian, and later Gravettian and Creswellian periods. The site is the oldest known ceremonial burial in Western Europe.

There have been calls to return the red skeleton of Paviland to Wales where it was discovered and also specifically to Swansea.

History

Discovery 

In 1822 Daniel Davies and the Rev John Davies found animal bones, including the tusk of a mammoth. The Talbot family of Penrice Castle was informed and found "bones of elephants" on 27 December 1822. William Buckland, Professor of Geology at Oxford University arrived on 18 January 1823 and spent a week at the location site, Goat's Hole. Later that year, writing about his find in his book Reliquiae Diluvianae (Remains or relics of the Flood), Buckland stated: 

Buckland's treatise misjudged both its age and sex. He believed that human remains could not be older than the Biblical Great Flood, and thus wildly underestimated its true age, believing the remains to date to the Roman era. Buckland believed the skeleton was female largely because it was discovered with decorative items, including perforated seashell necklaces and jewellery thought to be of elephant ivory but now known to be carved from the tusk of a mammoth.

Later findings 

William Solace made an expedition to Goat's Cave Paviland in 1912. There, Solace found flint arrow heads and tools and correctly concluded that the skeleton was in fact a male hunter-gatherer or warrior during the last Ice Age. Over the last 100 years the date estimated by Solace has been shifted from the Mesolithic period (4-10,000 BCE) to the Palaeolithic era (35,000/10,000 BCE) of the last Ice Age. However, before radiocarbon dating was invented in the 1950s, there was no existing scientific method for the determination of the age of any prehistoric remains. 

In the 1960s, Kenneth Oakley published a radiocarbon determination of 18,460 ± 340 BP.  Results published in 1989 and 1995 suggest that the individual from the cave lived about 26,000 years ago (26,350 ± 550 BP, OxA-1815), during the later periods of the Upper Paleolithic. A 2007 examination by Thomas Higham of Oxford University and Roger Jacobi of the British Museum suggested a dating of 29,000 years ago. A recalibration of the results in 2009 suggest an age of 33,000 years.

Although now on the coast, at the time of the burial the cave would have been located approximately 110 km (70 miles) inland, overlooking a plain. When the remains were dated to some 26,000 years ago, it was thought the "Red Lady" lived at a time when an ice sheet of the most recent glacial period in the British Isles, called the Devensian Glaciation, would have been advancing towards the site, and that consequently the weather would have been more like that of present-day Siberia, with maximum temperatures of perhaps 10°C in summer, −20° in winter, and a tundra vegetation. The new dating however indicates he lived during a warmer period.

Bone protein analysis indicates that he lived on a diet of between 15% and 20% fish, which, together with the distance from the sea, suggests that the people may have been semi-nomadic, or that the tribe transported the body from a coastal region for burial.

When the skeleton was discovered, Wales lacked a museum to house it, so it was moved to Oxford University, where Buckland was a professor.  The bones are currently on display at the Oxford University Museum of Natural History. In December 2007, it was loaned for a year to the National Museum Cardiff. Subsequent excavations yielded more than 4,000 flints, teeth and bones, needles and bracelets, which are on exhibit at Swansea Museum and the National Museum in Cardiff.

Evidence of earliest modern humans
Analysis of the evidence from the two excavations at Long Hole Cave on the Gower Peninsula, including sediment and pollen as well as the lithic evidence, has identified Long Hole as an Aurignacian site contemporary with and related to the site at Paviland, evidence of the first modern humans in Britain.

Proposed return to Wales 

Following the discovery of the Red Lady of Paviland in 1823, the skeleton was immediately transported to Oxford University museum in England which prompted a two-century campaign it to be repatriated back to Wales.

In 2004, Swansea councillor Ioan Richard started a campaign to get the Red Lady back in Wales who said that "this very important piece of history has been taken from the Welsh by the English."

In 2006, it was agreed that they would be temporarily loaned to the National Museum of Wales.

In 2013, former chairman of the Welsh conservatives Byron Davies called for the red skeleton of Paviland to "come home" to Wales. He had the go-ahead from the UK government to put together a formal bid to repatriate the ancient remains.

In 2023, Mr Davies, who has long campaigned for the return of the skeleton to Wales, was cited by BBC News that he would not give up on his dream of seeing the Red Lady returned to Swansea. These calls were also supported by Professor George Nash, of the University of Liverpool and Coimbra University in Portugal, who said "If there was a way the remains could be brought back to Wales safely - and that's a very big 'if' - I think it would definitely be the right thing to do."

See also
 Prehistoric Wales
 Archaeology of Wales 
 Boxgrove
 Gough's Cave
 Happisburgh
 Kents Cavern
 Pakefield
 Pontnewydd
 Swanscombe
 Creswell Crags

General:
 List of prehistoric structures in Great Britain
 Geology of the United Kingdom
 Genetic history of the British Isles
 List of human evolution fossils
 Prehistoric Britain

References

Further reading
 Stephen Aldhouse-Green and Paul Pettitt Paviland Cave: contextualizing the ‘Red Lady’ Antiquity Volume 72, Issue 278 December 1998, pp. 756–772

External links
 University of Oxford Red Lady of Paviland Oxford University Museum of Natural History, 
 British Archaeology magazine, Oct. 2001, "Great Sites: Paviland Cave"
 Paviland Cave - Explore Gower
 Geographical location of the cave where the remains were found

Upper Paleolithic Homo sapiens fossils
Stone Age sites in Wales
Gower Peninsula
Paleoanthropological sites
Aurignacian
1823 archaeological discoveries
Prehistoric burials in Wales
Prehistoric Britain